A gear is a rotating circular machine part having cut teeth or, in the case of a cogwheel or gearwheel, inserted teeth (called cogs), which mesh with another (compatible) toothed part to transmit (convert) torque and speed. The basic principle behind the operation of gears is analogous to the basic principle of levers. A gear may also be known informally as a cog. Geared devices can change the speed, torque, and direction of a power source. Gears of different sizes produce a change in torque, creating a mechanical advantage, through their gear ratio, and thus may be considered a simple machine. The rotational speeds, and the torques, of two meshing gears differ in proportion to their diameters. The teeth on the two meshing gears all have the same shape.

Two or more meshing gears, working in a sequence, are called a gear train or a transmission. The gears in a transmission are analogous to the wheels in a crossed, belt pulley system. An advantage of gears is that the teeth of a gear prevent slippage. In transmissions with multiple gear ratios—such as bicycles, motorcycles, and cars—the term "gear" (e.g., "first gear") refers to a gear ratio rather than an actual physical gear. The term describes similar devices, even when the gear ratio is continuous rather than discrete, or when the device does not actually contain gears, as in a continuously variable transmission (CVT). Sometimes a CVT is referred to as an "infinitely variable transmission".

Furthermore, a gear can mesh with a linear toothed part, called a rack, producing movement in a straight line instead of rotation (movement in a circle). See Rack and Pinion for an example.

History

Early examples of gears date from the 4th century BC in China (Zhan Guo times – Late East Zhou dynasty), which have been preserved at the Luoyang Museum of Henan Province, China. The earliest preserved gears in Europe were found in the Antikythera mechanism an example of a very early and intricate geared device, designed to calculate astronomical positions.  Its time of construction is now estimated between 150 and 100 BC. Gears appear in works connected to Hero of Alexandria, in Roman Egypt circa AD 50, but can be traced back to the mechanics of the Library of Alexandria in 3rd-century BC Ptolemaic Egypt, and were greatly developed by the Greek polymath Archimedes (287–212 BC).

A complex geared calendrical device showing the phase of the Moon, the day of the month and the places of the Sun and the Moon in the Zodiac was invented in the Byzantine empire in the early 6th century AD. The worm gear was invented in the Indian subcontinent, for use in roller cotton gins, some time during the 13th–14th centuries. Differential gears may have been used in some of the Chinese south-pointing chariots, but the first verifiable use of differential gears was by the British clock maker Joseph Williamson in 1720.

Examples of early gear applications include:
1386 AD: The Salisbury Cathedral clock: it is the world's oldest still working geared mechanical clock.
The Astrarium of Giovanni Dondi dell'Orologio was a complex astronomical clock built between 1348 and 1364 by Giovanni Dondi dell'Orologio. The Astrarium had seven faces and 107 moving parts; it showed the positions of the sun, the moon and the five planets then known, as well as religious feast days.
c. 13th–14th centuries: The worm gear was invented as part of a roller cotton gin in the Indian subcontinent.
c. 1221 AD The geared astrolabe was built in Isfahan showing the position of the moon in the zodiac and its phase, and the number of days since new moon.
c. 6th century AD: A geared calendrical device showing the phase of the Moon, the day of the month and the Zodiac was invented in the Byzantine empire.
725 AD: The first geared mechanical clocks were built in China.
2nd century BC: The Antikythera mechanism, the world's oldest analog computer is built. It could predict the movement and position of the sun, moon and planets decades in advance and could solve different astronomical problems.
c. 200–265 AD: Ma Jun used gears as part of a south-pointing chariot.
In nature: in the hind legs of the nymphs of the planthopper insect Issus coleoptratus.

Etymology

The word gear is probably from Old Norse gørvi (plural gørvar) 'apparel, gear,' related to gøra, gørva 'to make, construct, build; set in order, prepare,' a common verb in Old Norse, "used in a wide range of situations from writing a book to dressing meat". In this context, the meaning of 'toothed wheel in machinery' first attested 1520s; specific mechanical sense of 'parts by which a motor communicates motion' is from 1814; specifically of a vehicle (bicycle, automobile, etc.) by 1888.

A cog is a tooth on a wheel.  From Middle English cogge, from Old Norse (compare Norwegian kugg ('cog'), Swedish kugg, kugge ('cog, tooth')), from Proto-Germanic *kuggō (compare Dutch kogge ('cogboat'), German Kock), from Proto-Indo-European *gugā ('hump, ball') (compare Lithuanian gugà ('pommel, hump, hill'), from PIE *gēw- ('to bend, arch'). First used c. 1300 in the sense of 'a wheel having teeth or cogs; late 14c., 'tooth on a wheel'; cog-wheel, early 15c.

Historically, cogs were teeth made of wood rather than metal, and a cogwheel technically consisted of a series of wooden gear teeth located around a mortise wheel, each tooth forming a type of specialised 'through' mortise and tenon joint. The wheel can be made of wood, cast iron, or other material. Wooden cogs were formerly used when large metal gears could not be cut, when the cast tooth was not even approximately of the proper shape, or the size of the wheel made manufacture impractical.

The cogs were often made of maple wood. In 1967 the Thompson Manufacturing Company of Lancaster, New Hampshire still had a very active business in supplying tens of thousands of maple gear teeth per year, mostly for use in paper mills and grist mills, some dating back over 100 years. Since a wooden cog performs exactly the same function as a cast or machined metal tooth, the word was applied by extension to both, and the distinction has been generally lost.

Comparison with drive mechanisms
The definite ratio that teeth give gears provides an advantage over other drives (such as traction drives and V-belts) in precision machines such as watches that depend upon an exact velocity ratio. In cases where driver and follower are proximal, gears also have an advantage over other drives in the reduced number of parts required. The downside is that gears are more expensive to manufacture and their lubrication requirements may impose a higher operating cost per hour.

Types

External versus internal gears

An external gear is one with the teeth formed on the outer surface of a cylinder or cone. Conversely, an internal gear is one with the teeth formed on the inner surface of a cylinder or cone. For bevel gears, an internal gear is one with the pitch angle exceeding 90 degrees. Internal gears do not cause output shaft direction reversal.

Spur

Spur gears or straight-cut gears are the simplest type of gear. They consist of a cylinder or disk with teeth projecting radially. Though the teeth are not straight-sided (but usually of special form to achieve a constant drive ratio, mainly involute but less commonly cycloidal), the edge of each tooth is straight and aligned parallel to the axis of rotation. These gears mesh together correctly only if fitted to parallel shafts. No axial thrust is created by the tooth loads. Spur gears are excellent at moderate speeds but tend to be noisy at high speeds.

Helical

Helical or "dry fixed" gears offer a refinement over spur gears. The leading edges of the teeth are not parallel to the axis of rotation, but are set at an angle. Since the gear is curved, this angling makes the tooth shape a segment of a helix. Helical gears can be meshed in parallel or crossed orientations. The former refers to when the shafts are parallel to each other; this is the most common orientation. In the latter, the shafts are non-parallel, and in this configuration the gears are sometimes known as "skew gears".

The angled teeth engage more gradually than do spur gear teeth, causing them to run more smoothly and quietly. With parallel helical gears, each pair of teeth first make contact at a single point at one side of the gear wheel; a moving curve of contact then grows gradually across the tooth face to a maximum, then recedes until the teeth break contact at a single point on the opposite side. In spur gears, teeth suddenly meet at a line contact across their entire width, causing stress and noise. Spur gears make a characteristic whine at high speeds. For this reason spur gears are used in low-speed applications and in situations where noise control is not a problem, and helical gears are used in high-speed applications, large power transmission, or where noise abatement is important. The speed is considered high when the pitch line velocity exceeds 25 m/s.

A disadvantage of helical gears is a resultant thrust along the axis of the gear, which must be accommodated by appropriate thrust bearings. However, this issue can be circumvented by using a herringbone gear or double helical gear, which has no axial thrust - and also provides self-aligning of the gears. This results in less axial thrust than a comparable spur gear.

A second disadvantage of helical gears is also a greater degree of sliding friction between the meshing teeth, often addressed with additives in the lubricant.

Skew gears
For a "crossed" or "skew" configuration, the gears must have the same pressure angle and normal pitch; however, the helix angle and handedness can be different. The relationship between the two shafts is actually defined by the helix angle(s) of the two shafts and the handedness, as defined:
 for gears of the same handedness,
 for gears of opposite handedness,
where  is the helix angle for the gear. The crossed configuration is less mechanically sound because there is only a point contact between the gears, whereas in the parallel configuration there is a line contact.

Quite commonly, helical gears are used with the helix angle of one having the negative of the helix angle of the other; such a pair might also be referred to as having a right-handed helix and a left-handed helix of equal angles. The two equal but opposite angles add to zero: the angle between shafts is zero—that is, the shafts are parallel. Where the sum or the difference (as described in the equations above) is not zero, the shafts are crossed. For shafts crossed at right angles, the helix angles are of the same hand because they must add to 90 degrees. (This is the case with the gears in the illustration above: they mesh correctly in the crossed configuration: for the parallel configuration, one of the helix angles should be reversed. The gears illustrated cannot mesh with the shafts parallel.)

 3D animation of helical gears (parallel axis)
 3D animation of helical gears (crossed axis)

Double helical

Double helical gears overcome the problem of axial thrust presented by single helical gears by using a double set of teeth, slanted in opposite directions. A double helical gear can be thought of as two mirrored helical gears mounted closely together on a common axle. This arrangement cancels out the net axial thrust, since each half of the gear thrusts in the opposite direction, resulting in a net axial force of zero. This arrangement can also remove the need for thrust bearings. However, double helical gears are more difficult to manufacture due to their more complicated shape.

Herringbone gears are a special type of helical gears. They do not have a groove in the middle like some other double helical gears do; the two mirrored helical gears are joined so that their teeth form a V shape. This can also be applied to bevel gears, as in the final drive of the Citroën Type A.

For both possible rotational directions, there exist two possible arrangements for the oppositely-oriented helical gears or gear faces. One arrangement is called stable, and the other unstable. In a stable arrangement, the helical gear faces are oriented so that each axial force is directed toward the center of the gear. In an unstable arrangement, both axial forces are directed away from the center of the gear. In either arrangement, the total (or net) axial force on each gear is zero when the gears are aligned correctly. If the gears become misaligned in the axial direction, the unstable arrangement generates a net force that may lead to disassembly of the gear train, while the stable arrangement generates a net corrective force. If the direction of rotation is reversed, the direction of the axial thrusts is also reversed, so a stable configuration becomes unstable, and vice versa.

Stable double helical gears can be directly interchanged with spur gears without any need for different bearings.

Bevel

A bevel gear is shaped like a conical frustum (a right circular cone with most of the tip cut off). When two bevel gears mesh, their imaginary vertices must occupy the same point. Their shaft axes also intersect at this point, forming an arbitrary non-straight angle between the shafts. The angle between the shafts can be anything except zero or 180 degrees. Bevel gears with equal numbers of teeth and shaft axes at 90 degrees are called miter (US) or mitre (UK) gears.

Spiral bevels

Spiral bevel gears can be manufactured as Gleason types (circular arc with non-constant tooth depth), Oerlikon and Curvex types (circular arc with constant tooth depth), Klingelnberg Cyclo-Palloid (Epicycloid with constant tooth depth) or Klingelnberg Palloid. Spiral bevel gears have the same advantages and disadvantages relative to their straight-cut cousins as helical gears do to spur gears. Straight bevel gears are generally used only at speeds below 5 m/s (1000 ft/min), or, for small gears, 1000 r.p.m.

The cylindrical gear tooth profile corresponds to an involute, but the bevel gear tooth profile to an octoid.
All traditional bevel gear generators (like Gleason, Klingelnberg, Heidenreich & Harbeck, WMW Modul) manufacture bevel gears with an octoidal tooth profile. For 5-axis milled bevel gear sets it is important to choose the same calculation / layout like the conventional manufacturing method.
Simplified calculated bevel gears on the basis of an equivalent cylindrical gear in normal section with an involute tooth form show a deviant tooth form with reduced tooth strength by 10-28% without offset and 45% with offset [Diss. Hünecke, TU Dresden].
Furthermore, the "involute bevel gear sets" cause more noise.

Hypoid

Hypoid gears resemble spiral bevel gears except the shaft axes do not intersect. The pitch surfaces appear conical but, to compensate for the offset shaft, are in fact hyperboloids of revolution. Hypoid gears are almost always designed to operate with shafts at 90 degrees. Depending on which side the shaft is offset to, relative to the angling of the teeth, contact between hypoid gear teeth may be even smoother and more gradual than with spiral bevel gear teeth, but also have a sliding action along the meshing teeth as it rotates and therefore usually require some of the most viscous types of gear oil to avoid it being extruded from the mating tooth faces, the oil is normally designated HP (for hypoid) followed by a number denoting the viscosity. Also, the pinion can be designed with fewer teeth than a spiral bevel pinion, with the result that gear ratios of 60:1 and higher are feasible using a single set of hypoid gears. This style of gear is most common in motor vehicle drive trains, in concert with a differential. Whereas a regular (nonhypoid) ring-and-pinion gear set is suitable for many applications, it is not ideal for vehicle drive trains because it generates more noise and vibration than a hypoid does. Bringing hypoid gears to market for mass-production applications was an engineering improvement of the 1920s.

Crown gear

Crown gears or contrate gears are a particular form of bevel gear whose teeth project at right angles to the plane of the wheel; in their orientation the teeth resemble the points on a crown. A crown gear can only mesh accurately with another bevel gear, although crown gears are sometimes seen meshing with spur gears. A crown gear is also sometimes meshed with an escapement such as found in mechanical clocks.

Worm

Worms resemble screws. A worm is meshed with a worm wheel, which looks similar to a spur gear.

Worm-and-gear sets are a simple and compact way to achieve a high torque, low speed gear ratio. For example, helical gears are normally limited to gear ratios of less than 10:1 while worm-and-gear sets vary from 10:1 to 500:1. A disadvantage is the potential for considerable sliding action, leading to low efficiency.

A worm gear is a species of helical gear, but its helix angle is usually somewhat large (close to 90 degrees) and its body is usually fairly long in the axial direction. These attributes give it screw like qualities. The distinction between a worm and a helical gear is that at least one tooth persists for a full rotation around the helix. If this occurs, it is a 'worm'; if not, it is a 'helical gear'. A worm may have as few as one tooth. If that tooth persists for several turns around the helix, the worm appears, superficially, to have more than one tooth, but what one in fact sees is the same tooth reappearing at intervals along the length of the worm. The usual screw nomenclature applies: a one-toothed worm is called single thread or single start; a worm with more than one tooth is called multiple thread or multiple start. The helix angle of a worm is not usually specified. Instead, the lead angle, which is equal to 90 degrees minus the helix angle, is given.

In a worm-and-gear set, the worm can always drive the gear. However, if the gear attempts to drive the worm, it may or may not succeed. Particularly if the lead angle is small, the gear's teeth may simply lock against the worm's teeth, because the force component circumferential to the worm is not sufficient to overcome friction. In traditional music boxes, however, the gear drives the worm, which has a large helix angle. This mesh drives the speed-limiter vanes which are mounted on the worm shaft.

Worm-and-gear sets that do lock are called self locking, which can be used to advantage, as when it is desired to set the position of a mechanism by turning the worm and then have the mechanism hold that position. An example is the machine head found on some types of stringed instruments.

If the gear in a worm-and-gear set is an ordinary helical gear only a single point of contact is achieved. If medium to high power transmission is desired, the tooth shape of the gear is modified to achieve more intimate contact by making both gears partially envelop each other. This is done by making both concave and joining them at a saddle point; this is called a cone-drive or "Double enveloping".

Worm gears can be right or left-handed, following the long-established practice for screw threads.

Non-circular

Non-circular gears are designed for special purposes. While a regular gear is optimized to transmit torque to another engaged member with minimum noise and wear and maximum efficiency, a non-circular gear's main objective might be ratio variations, axle displacement oscillations and more. Common applications include textile machines, potentiometers and continuously variable transmissions.

Rack and pinion

A rack is a toothed bar or rod that can be thought of as a sector gear with an infinitely large radius of curvature. Torque can be converted to linear force by meshing a rack with a round gear called a pinion: the pinion turns, while the rack moves in a straight line. Such a mechanism is used in automobiles to convert the rotation of the steering wheel into the left-to-right motion of the tie rod(s).

Racks also feature in the theory of gear geometry, where, for instance, the tooth shape of an interchangeable set of gears may be specified for the rack (infinite radius), and the tooth shapes for gears of particular actual radii are then derived from that. The rack and pinion gear type is also used in a rack railway.

Epicyclic gear train

In epicyclic gearing, one or more of the gear axes moves. Examples are sun and planet gearing (see below), cycloidal drive, automatic transmissions, and mechanical differentials.

Sun and planet

Sun and planet gearing is a method of converting reciprocating motion into rotary motion that was used in steam engines. James Watt used it on his early steam engines to get around the patent on the crank, but it also provided the advantage of increasing the flywheel speed so Watt could use a lighter flywheel.

In the illustration, the sun is yellow, the planet red, the reciprocating arm is blue, the flywheel is green and the driveshaft is gray.

Harmonic gear

A harmonic gear or strain wave gear is a specialized gearing mechanism often used in industrial motion control, robotics and aerospace for its advantages over traditional gearing systems, including lack of backlash, compactness and high gear ratios.

Though the diagram does not demonstrate the correct configuration, it is a "timing gear," conventionally with far more teeth than a traditional gear to ensure a higher degree of precision.

Cage gear

A cage gear, also called a lantern gear or lantern pinion, has cylindrical rods for teeth, parallel to the axle and arranged in a circle around it, much as the bars on a round bird cage or lantern. The assembly is held together by disks at each end, into which the tooth rods and axle are set. Cage gears are more efficient than solid pinions, and dirt can fall through the rods rather than becoming trapped and increasing wear. They can be constructed with very simple tools as the teeth are not formed by cutting or milling, but rather by drilling holes and inserting rods.

Sometimes used in clocks, the cage gear should always be driven by a gearwheel, not used as the driver. The cage gear was not initially favoured by conservative clock makers. It became popular in turret clocks where dirty working conditions were most commonplace. Domestic American clock movements often used them.

Cycloidal gear

Magnetic gear

All cogs of each gear component of magnetic gears act as a constant magnet with periodic alternation of opposite magnetic poles on mating surfaces. Gear components are mounted with a backlash capability similar to other mechanical gearings. Although they cannot exert as much force as a traditional gear due to limits on magnetic field strength, such gears work without touching and so are immune to wear, have very low noise, minimal power losses from friction and can slip without damage making them very reliable. They can be used in configurations that are not possible for gears that must be physically touching and can operate with a non-metallic barrier completely separating the driving force from the load. The magnetic coupling can transmit force into a hermetically sealed enclosure without using a radial shaft seal, which may leak.

Nomenclature

General

 Rotational frequency, n  Measured in rotation over time, such as revolutions per minute (RPM or rpm).
 Angular frequency, ω  Measured in radians/second. 1RPM = 2πrad/minute = π/30rad/second.
 Number of teeth, N  How many teeth a gear has, an integer. In the case of worms, it is the number of thread starts that the worm has.
 Gear, wheel  The larger of two interacting gears or a gear on its own.
 Pinion  The smaller of two interacting gears.
 Path of contact  Path followed by the point of contact between two meshing gear teeth.
 Line of action, pressure line  Line along which the force between two meshing gear teeth is directed. It has the same direction as the force vector. In general, the line of action changes from moment to moment during the period of engagement of a pair of teeth. For involute gears, however, the tooth-to-tooth force is always directed along the same line—that is, the line of action is constant. This implies that for involute gears the path of contact is also a straight line, coincident with the line of action—as is indeed the case.
 Axis  Axis of revolution of the gear; center line of the shaft.
 Pitch point  Point where the line of action crosses a line joining the two gear axes.
 Pitch circle, pitch line  Circle centered on and perpendicular to the axis, and passing through the pitch point. A predefined diametral position on the gear where the circular tooth thickness, pressure angle and helix angles are defined.
 Pitch diameter, d A predefined diametral position on the gear where the circular tooth thickness, pressure angle and helix angles are defined. The standard pitch diameter is a design dimension and cannot be measured, but is a location where other measurements are made. Its value is based on the number of teeth (N), the normal module (mn; or normal diametral pitch, Pd), and the helix angle:
 Module or modulus, m Since it is impractical to calculate circular pitch with irrational numbers, mechanical engineers usually use a scaling factor that replaces it with a regular value instead. This is known as the module or modulus of the wheel and is simply defined as:

 where m is the module and p the circular pitch. The units of module are customarily millimeters; an English Module is sometimes used with the units of inches. When the diametral pitch, DP, is in English units,
  in conventional metric units.
 The distance between the two axis becomes:
 
 where a is the axis distance, z1 and z2 are the number of cogs (teeth) for each of the two wheels (gears). These numbers (or at least one of them) is often chosen among primes to create an even contact between every cog of both wheels, and thereby avoid unnecessary wear and damage. An even uniform gear wear is achieved by ensuring the tooth counts of the two gears meshing together are relatively prime to each other; this occurs when the greatest common divisor (GCD) of each gear tooth count equals 1, e.g. GCD(16,25)=1; if a 1:1 gear ratio is desired a relatively prime gear may be inserted in between the two gears; this maintains the 1:1 ratio but reverses the gear direction; a second relatively prime gear could also be inserted to restore the original rotational direction while maintaining uniform wear with all 4 gears in this case. Mechanical engineers, at least in continental Europe, usually use the module instead of circular pitch. The module, just like the circular pitch, can be used for all types of cogs, not just evolvent based straight cogs.
 Operating pitch diameters  Diameters determined from the number of teeth and the center distance at which gears operate. Example for pinion:
 
 Pitch surface  In cylindrical gears, cylinder formed by projecting a pitch circle in the axial direction. More generally, the surface formed by the sum of all the pitch circles as one moves along the axis. For bevel gears it is a cone.
 Angle of action  Angle with vertex at the gear center, one leg on the point where mating teeth first make contact, the other leg on the point where they disengage.
 Arc of action  Segment of a pitch circle subtended by the angle of action.
 Pressure angle,   The complement of the angle between the direction that the teeth exert force on each other, and the line joining the centers of the two gears. For involute gears, the teeth always exert force along the line of action, which, for involute gears, is a straight line; and thus, for involute gears, the pressure angle is constant.
 Outside diameter,   Diameter of the gear, measured from the tops of the teeth.
 Root diameter  Diameter of the gear, measured at the base of the tooth.
 Addendum, a  Radial distance from the pitch surface to the outermost point of the tooth. 
 Dedendum, b  Radial distance from the depth of the tooth trough to the pitch surface. 
 Whole depth,   The distance from the top of the tooth to the root; it is equal to addendum plus dedendum or to working depth plus clearance.
 Clearance  Distance between the root circle of a gear and the addendum circle of its mate.
 Working depth  Depth of engagement of two gears, that is, the sum of their operating addendums.
 Circular pitch, p  Distance from one face of a tooth to the corresponding face of an adjacent tooth on the same gear, measured along the pitch circle.
 Diametral pitch, DP 
 
 Ratio of the number of teeth to the pitch diameter. Could be measured in teeth per inch or teeth per centimeter, but conventionally has units of per inch of diameter. Where the module, m, is in metric units
  in English units
 Base circle  In involute gears, the tooth profile is generated by the involute of the base circle. The radius of the base circle is somewhat smaller than that of the pitch circle
 Base pitch, normal pitch,   In involute gears, distance from one face of a tooth to the corresponding face of an adjacent tooth on the same gear, measured along the base circle
 Interference  Contact between teeth other than at the intended parts of their surfaces
 Interchangeable set  A set of gears, any of which mates properly with any other

Helical gear
 Helix angle,   the Angle between a tangent to the helix and the gear axis. It is zero in the limiting case of a spur gear, albeit it can considered as the hypotenuse angle as well.
 Normal circular pitch,   Circular pitch in the plane normal to the teeth.
 Transverse circular pitch, p  Circular pitch in the plane of rotation of the gear. Sometimes just called "circular pitch". 

Several other helix parameters can be viewed either in the normal or transverse planes. The subscript n usually indicates the normal.

Worm gear
 Lead  Distance from any point on a thread to the corresponding point on the next turn of the same thread, measured parallel to the axis.
 Linear pitch, p  Distance from any point on a thread to the corresponding point on the adjacent thread, measured parallel to the axis. For a single-thread worm, lead and linear pitch are the same.
 Lead angle,   Angle between a tangent to the helix and a plane perpendicular to the axis. Note that the complement of the helix angle is usually given for helical gears.
 Pitch diameter,   Same as described earlier in this list. Note that for a worm it is still measured in a plane perpendicular to the gear axis, not a tilted plane.
Subscript w denotes the worm, subscript g denotes the gear.

Tooth contact

 Point of contact  Any point at which two tooth profiles touch each other.
 Line of contact  A line or curve along which two tooth surfaces are tangent to each other.
 Path of action  The locus of successive contact points between a pair of gear teeth, during the phase of engagement. For conjugate gear teeth, the path of action passes through the pitch point. It is the trace of the surface of action in the plane of rotation.
 Line of action  The path of action for involute gears. It is the straight line passing through the pitch point and tangent to both base circles.
 Surface of action  The imaginary surface in which contact occurs between two engaging tooth surfaces. It is the summation of the paths of action in all sections of the engaging teeth.
 Plane of action The surface of action for involute, parallel axis gears with either spur or helical teeth. It is tangent to the base cylinders.
 Zone of action (contact zone)  For involute, parallel-axis gears with either spur or helical teeth, is the rectangular area in the plane of action bounded by the length of action and the effective face width.
 Path of contact The curve on either tooth surface along which theoretical single point contact occurs during the engagement of gears with crowned tooth surfaces or gears that normally engage with only single point contact.
 Length of action The distance on the line of action through which the point of contact moves during the action of the tooth profile.
 Arc of action, Qt  The arc of the pitch circle through which a tooth profile moves from the beginning to the end of contact with a mating profile.
 Arc of approach, Qa  The arc of the pitch circle through which a tooth profile moves from its beginning of contact until the point of contact arrives at the pitch point.
 Arc of recess, Qr  The arc of the pitch circle through which a tooth profile moves from contact at the pitch point until contact ends.
 Contact ratio, mc, ε  The number of angular pitches through which a tooth surface rotates from the beginning to the end of contact. In a simple way, it can be defined as a measure of the average number of teeth in contact during the period during which a tooth comes and goes out of contact with the mating gear.
 Transverse contact ratio, mp, εα  The contact ratio in a transverse plane. It is the ratio of the angle of action to the angular pitch. For involute gears it is most directly obtained as the ratio of the length of action to the base pitch.
 Face contact ratio, mF, εβ  The contact ratio in an axial plane, or the ratio of the face width to the axial pitch. For bevel and hypoid gears it is the ratio of face advance to circular pitch.
 Total contact ratio, mt, εγ  The sum of the transverse contact ratio and the face contact ratio.
 
 
 Modified contact ratio, mo  For bevel gears, the square root of the sum of the squares of the transverse and face contact ratios.
 
 Limit diameter  Diameter on a gear at which the line of action intersects the maximum (or minimum for internal pinion) addendum circle of the mating gear. This is also referred to as the start of active profile, the start of contact, the end of contact, or the end of active profile.
 Start of active profile (SAP)  Intersection of the limit diameter and the involute profile.
 Face advance  Distance on a pitch circle through which a helical or spiral tooth moves from the position at which contact begins at one end of the tooth trace on the pitch surface to the position where contact ceases at the other end.

Tooth thickness

 Circular thickness  Length of arc between the two sides of a gear tooth, on the specified datum circle.
 Transverse circular thickness  Circular thickness in the transverse plane.
 Normal circular thickness  Circular thickness in the normal plane. In a helical gear it may be considered as the length of arc along a normal helix.
 Axial thickness In helical gears and worms, tooth thickness in an axial cross section at the standard pitch diameter.
 Base circular thickness In involute teeth, length of arc on the base circle between the two involute curves forming the profile of a tooth.
 Normal chordal thickness Length of the chord that subtends a circular thickness arc in the plane normal to the pitch helix. Any convenient measuring diameter may be selected, not necessarily the standard pitch diameter.
 Chordal addendum (chordal height)  Height from the top of the tooth to the chord subtending the circular thickness arc. Any convenient measuring diameter may be selected, not necessarily the standard pitch diameter.
 Profile shift  Displacement of the basic rack datum line from the reference cylinder, made non-dimensional by dividing by the normal module. It is used to specify the tooth thickness, often for zero backlash.
 Rack shift  Displacement of the tool datum line from the reference cylinder, made non-dimensional by dividing by the normal module. It is used to specify the tooth thickness.
 Measurement over pins  Measurement of the distance taken over a pin positioned in a tooth space and a reference surface. The reference surface may be the reference axis of the gear, a datum surface or either one or two pins positioned in the tooth space or spaces opposite the first. This measurement is used to determine tooth thickness.
 Span measurement  Measurement of the distance across several teeth in a normal plane. As long as the measuring device has parallel measuring surfaces that contact on an unmodified portion of the involute, the measurement wis along a line tangent to the base cylinder. It is used to determine tooth thickness.
 Modified addendum teeth  Teeth of engaging gears, one or both of which have non-standard addendum.
 Full-depth teeth  Teeth in which the working depth equals 2.000 divided by the normal diametral pitch.
 Stub teeth  Teeth in which the working depth is less than 2.000 divided by the normal diametral pitch.
 Equal addendum teeth  Teeth in which two engaging gears have equal addendums.
 Long and short-addendum teeth  Teeth in which the addendums of two engaging gears are unequal.

Pitch
Pitch is the distance between a point on one tooth and the corresponding point on an adjacent tooth. It is a dimension measured along a line or curve in the transverse, normal, or axial directions. The use of the single word pitch without qualification may be ambiguous, and for this reason it is preferable to use specific designations such as transverse circular pitch, normal base pitch, axial pitch.

 Circular pitch, p  Arc distance along a specified pitch circle or pitch line between corresponding profiles of adjacent teeth.
 Transverse circular pitch, pt  Circular pitch in the transverse plane.
 Normal circular pitch, pn, pe  Circular pitch in the normal plane, and also the length of the arc along the normal pitch helix between helical teeth or threads.
 Axial pitch, px  Linear pitch in an axial plane and in a pitch surface. In helical gears and worms, axial pitch has the same value at all diameters. In gearing of other types, axial pitch may be confined to the pitch surface and may be a circular measurement. The term axial pitch is preferred to the term linear pitch. The axial pitch of a helical worm and the circular pitch of its worm gear are the same.
 Normal base pitch, pN, pbn An involute helical gear is the base pitch in the normal plane. It is the normal distance between parallel helical involute surfaces on the plane of action in the normal plane, or is the length of arc on the normal base helix. It is a constant distance in any helical involute gear.
 Transverse base pitch, pb, pbt  In an involute gear, the pitch is on the base circle or along the line of action. Corresponding sides of involute gear teeth are parallel curves, and the base pitch is the constant and fundamental distance between them along a common normal in a transverse plane.
 Diametral pitch (transverse), Pd  Ratio of the number of teeth to the standard pitch diameter in inches.
 
 Normal diametrical pitch, Pnd  Value of diametrical pitch in a normal plane of a helical gear or worm.
 
 Angular pitch, θN, τ  Angle subtended by the circular pitch, usually expressed in radians.
  degrees or  radians

Backlash

Backlash is the error in motion that occurs when gears change direction. It exists because there is always some gap between the trailing face of the driving tooth and the leading face of the tooth behind it on the driven gear, and that gap must be closed before force can be transferred in the new direction. The term "backlash" can also be used to refer to the size of the gap, not just the phenomenon it causes; thus, one could speak of a pair of gears as having, for example, "0.1 mm of backlash." A pair of gears could be designed to have zero backlash, but this would presuppose perfection in manufacturing, uniform thermal expansion characteristics throughout the system, and no lubricant. Therefore, gear pairs are designed to have some backlash. It is usually provided by reducing the tooth thickness of each gear by half the desired gap distance. In the case of a large gear and a small pinion, however, the backlash is usually taken entirely off the gear and the pinion is given full sized teeth. Backlash can also be provided by moving the gears further apart. The backlash of a gear train equals the sum of the backlash of each pair of gears, so in long trains backlash can become a problem.

For situations that require precision, such as instrumentation and control, backlash can be minimized through one of several techniques. For instance, the gear can be split along a plane perpendicular to the axis, one half fixed to the shaft in the usual manner, the other half placed alongside it, free to rotate about the shaft, but with springs between the two-halves providing relative torque between them, so that one achieves, in effect, a single gear with expanding teeth. Another method involves tapering the teeth in the axial direction and letting the gear slide in the axial direction to take up slack.

Shifting of gears
In some machines (e.g., automobiles) it is necessary to alter the gear ratio to suit the task, a process known as gear shifting or changing gear. There are several ways of shifting gears, for example:

Manual transmission
Automatic transmission
Derailleur gears, which are actually sprockets in combination with a roller chain
Hub gears (also called epicyclic gearing or sun-and-planet gears)

There are several outcomes of gear shifting in motor vehicles. In the case of vehicle noise emissions, there are higher sound levels emitted when the vehicle is engaged in lower gears. The design life of the lower ratio gears is shorter, so cheaper gears may be used, which tend to generate more noise due to smaller overlap ratio and a lower mesh stiffness etc. than the helical gears used for the high ratios. This fact has been used to analyze vehicle-generated sound since the late 1960s, and has been incorporated into the simulation of urban roadway noise and corresponding design of urban noise barriers along roadways.

Tooth profile

A profile is one side of a tooth in a cross section between the outside circle and the root circle. Usually a profile is the curve of intersection of a tooth surface and a plane or surface normal to the pitch surface, such as the transverse, normal, or axial plane.

The fillet curve (root fillet) is the concave portion of the tooth profile where it joins the bottom of the tooth space.2

As mentioned near the beginning of the article, the attainment of a nonfluctuating velocity ratio is dependent on the profile of the teeth.
Friction and wear between two gears is also dependent on the tooth profile. There are a great many tooth profiles that provide constant velocity ratios. In many cases, given an arbitrary tooth shape, it is possible to develop a tooth profile for the mating gear that provides a constant velocity ratio. However, two constant velocity tooth profiles are the most commonly used in modern times: the cycloid and the involute. The cycloid was more common until the late 1800s. Since then, the involute has largely superseded it, particularly in drive train applications. The cycloid is in some ways the more interesting and flexible shape; however the involute has two advantages: it is easier to manufacture, and it permits the center-to-center spacing of the gears to vary over some range without ruining the constancy of the velocity ratio. Cycloidal gears only work properly if the center spacing is exactly right. Cycloidal gears are still used in mechanical clocks.

An undercut is a condition in generated gear teeth when any part of the fillet curve lies inside of a line drawn tangent to the working profile at its point of juncture with the fillet. Undercut may be deliberately introduced to facilitate finishing operations. With undercut the fillet curve intersects the working profile. Without undercut the fillet curve and the working profile have a common tangent.

Gear materials

Numerous nonferrous alloys, cast irons, powder-metallurgy and plastics can be used in the manufacture of gears. However, steels are most commonly used because of their high strength-to-weight ratio and low cost. Plastic is commonly used where cost or weight is a concern. A properly designed plastic gear can replace steel in many cases because it has many desirable properties, including dirt tolerance, low speed meshing, the ability to "skip" quite well and the ability to be made with materials that don't need additional lubrication. Manufacturers have used plastic gears to reduce costs in consumer items including copy machines, optical storage devices, cheap dynamos, consumer audio equipment, servo motors, and printers.
Another advantage of the use of plastics, formerly (such as in the 1980s), was the reduction of repair costs for certain expensive machines. In cases of severe jamming (as of the paper in a printer), the plastic gear teeth would be torn free of their substrate, allowing the drive mechanism to then spin freely (instead of damaging itself by straining against the jam). This use of "sacrificial" gear teeth avoided destroying the much more expensive motor and related parts. This method has been superseded, in more recent designs, by the use of clutches and torque- or current-limited motors.

Standard pitches and the module system
Although gears can be made with any pitch, for convenience and interchangeability standard pitches are frequently used. Pitch is a property associated with linear dimensions and so differs whether the standard values are in the imperial (inch) or metric systems. Using inch measurements, standard diametral pitch values with units of "per inch" are chosen; the diametrical pitch is the number of teeth on a gear of one inch pitch diameter. Common standard values for spur gears are 3, 4, 5, 6, 8, 10, 12, 16, 20, 24, 32, 48, 64, 72, 80, 96, 100, 120, and 200. Certain standard pitches such as 1/10 and 1/20 in inch measurements, which mesh with linear rack, are actually (linear) circular pitch values with units of "inches"

When gear dimensions are in the metric system the pitch specification is generally in terms of module or modulus, which is effectively a length measurement across the pitch diameter. The term module is understood to mean the pitch diameter in millimetres divided by the number of teeth. When the module is based upon inch measurements, it is known as the English module to avoid confusion with the metric module. Module is a direct dimension, unlike diametrical pitch, which is an inverse dimension ("threads per inch"). Thus, if the pitch diameter of a gear is 40 mm and the number of teeth 20, the module is 2, which means that there are 2 mm of pitch diameter for each tooth. The preferred standard module values are 0.1, 0.2, 0.3, 0.4, 0.5, 0.6, 0.8, 1.0, 1.25, 1.5, 2.0, 2.5, 3, 4, 5, 6, 8, 10, 12, 16, 20, 25, 32, 40 and 50.

Manufacture

As of 2014, an estimated 80% of all gearing produced worldwide is produced by net shape molding. Molded gearing is usually either powder metallurgy or plastic. Many gears are done when they leave the mold (including injection molded plastic and die cast metal gears), but powdered metal gears require sintering and sand castings or investment castings require gear cutting or other machining to finish them. The most common form of gear cutting is hobbing, but gear shaping, milling, and broaching also exist. 3D printing as a production method is expanding rapidly. For metal gears in the transmissions of cars and trucks, the teeth are heat treated to make them hard and more wear resistant while leaving the core soft and tough. For large gears that are prone to warp, a quench press is used.

Gear model in modern physics
Modern physics adopted the gear model in different ways. In the nineteenth century, James Clerk Maxwell developed a model of electromagnetism in which magnetic field lines were rotating tubes of incompressible fluid. Maxwell used a gear wheel and called it an "idle wheel" to explain the electric current as a rotation of particles in opposite directions to that of the rotating field lines.

More recently, quantum physics uses "quantum gears" in their model. A group of gears can serve as a model for several different systems, such as an artificially constructed nanomechanical device or a group of ring molecules.

The three wave hypothesis compares the wave–particle duality to a bevel gear.

Gear mechanism in natural world

The gear mechanism was previously considered exclusively artificial, but as early as 1957, gears had been recognized in the hind legs of various species of planthoppers and scientists from the University of Cambridge characterized their functional significance in 2013 by doing high-speed photography of the nymphs of Issus coleoptratus at Cambridge University. These gears are found only in the nymph forms of all planthoppers, and are lost during the final molt to the adult stage. In I. coleoptratus, each leg has a 400-micrometer strip of teeth, pitch radius 200 micrometers, with 10 to 12 fully interlocking spur-type gear teeth, including filleted curves at the base of each tooth to reduce the risk of shearing. The joint rotates like mechanical gears, and synchronizes Issus's hind legs when it jumps to within 30 microseconds, preventing yaw rotation. The gears are not connected all the time. One is located on each of the juvenile insect's hind legs, and when it prepares to jump, the two sets of teeth lock together. As a result, the legs move in almost perfect unison, giving the insect more power as the gears rotate to their stopping point and then unlock.

See also

 Gear box
 Sprocket
 Differential
 Superposition principle
 Kinematic chain

References

Bibliography

Industrial Press (2012), Machinery's Handbook (29th ed.),

Further reading

 Kravchenko A.I., Bovda A.M. Gear with magnetic couple. Pat. of Ukraine N. 56700 – Bul. N. 2, 2011 – F16H 49/00.
 Sclater, Neil. (2011). "Gears: devices, drives and mechanisms." Mechanisms and Mechanical Devices Sourcebook. 5th ed. New York: McGraw Hill. pp. 131–174. . Drawings and designs of various gearings.
"Wheels That Can't Slip." Popular Science, February 1945, pp. 120–125.

External links

Geararium. Museum of gears and toothed wheels - antique and vintage gears, sprockets, ratchets and other gear-related objects.
Kinematic Models for Design Digital Library (KMODDL) - movies and photos of hundreds of working models at Cornell University
Short historical account on the application of analytical geometry to the form of gear teeth
Mathematical Tutorial for Gearing (Relating to Robotics)
American Gear Manufacturers Association
Gear Technology, the Journal of Gear Manufacturing

 
Tribology
Articles containing video clips